Glipostenoda kimotoi is a species of beetle in the genus Glipostenoda. It was described in 1957.

References

kimotoi
Beetles described in 1957